The MTV Video Music Award for Best Long Form Video was first given out in 1991. It was re-introduced in 2016 as Breakthrough Long Form Video and in 2022 under the original name.

Recipients

References

MTV Video Music Awards
Awards established in 1991
Awards disestablished in 2016